Célestino Alfonso (1 May 1916, at Ituero de Azaba, Salamanca province, Spain – 21 February 1944, at Fort Mont-Valérien, France) was a Spanish republican, a volunteer in the French liberation army FTP-MOI, and a part of the resistance operation led by Missak Manouchian.  He was, by profession, a carpenter.

Youth
Alfonso arrived in France at the beginning of the 1930s. In 1934, he joined the Jeunesse communiste (Communist Youth) and became responsible for the Ivry-sur-Seine group. In 1936, he set out as a volunteer for republican Spain, arriving on 27 August 1936. He served as a machine-gunner with the rank of sergeant, and from 1937, the rank of lieutenant. In 1938, his right hand was wounded. He was, shortly afterward, named political commissar of the 2nd International Brigade with the rank of captain. In February 1939, he was repatriated to the camp at Saint-Cyprien, from which he escaped.

Second World War
In May 1942, Alfonso joined the French resistance. Arrested, he was deported to Germany, where, after six months in a camp, he succeeded in escaping and returned to Paris where he became head of a FTP-MOI resistance group. He participated in many operations in Paris and in the Orléans region, notably the execution of General Ernst Von Schaumburg, commandant of Greater Paris, and on 29 September 1943 of SS officer , responsible for the STO in France.

Assassination of Ritter
The FTP-MOI intelligence service had noticed the strengthening of security measures on rue Saint-Dominique in Paris. A large Mercedes with swastikas on the sides regularly entered the courtyard of the Maison de la Chimie, and a Nazi official was let out. After four months of planning, the military leadership of the FTP requested Marcel Rayman,  and Alfonso to plan an attack against this official. The operation was put under the authority of Missak Manouchian, the military overseer of the FTP-MOI, from late August 1943.

On the morning of 28 September 1943, the Mercedes was parked for a few minutes before picking up its passenger. Alfonso fired at the SS officer as he got into the car. The windshield blocked the bullets, but the man was injured, probably by flying glass. He attempted to get out of the car through the opposite door, but Rayman hit him, fatally, with three bullets. The fighters only learned the man's identity through the German press: it was General , the assistant in France to Fritz Sauckel, who was responsible for the mobilization and deportation of labor under the German STO (Obligatory Work Service) in Nazi-occupied Europe. Ritter was the chief recruiter of slave labor in occupied France.

The front-page denunciation of this "abominable act" and the official funeral at the église de la Madeleine gave the operation even more impact.

Arrest and execution
Alfonso was arrested in October 1943, and he was shot at the fort Mont-Valérien on 21 February 1944, along with 21 other members of the FTP-MOI.  He had a wife and a small child.

Affiche rouge 
Alfonso's name was featured on the Affiche rouge poster, as: Alfonso, Espagnol rouge, 7 attentats (Alfonso, Spanish Communist, 7 attacks)

See also
 Main-d'œuvre immigrée
 Francs-tireurs et partisans - Main-d'œuvre immigrée
 Affiche rouge

External links
   L'Affiche rouge - Manouchian
   Discours d'André Santini et Henry Karayan

Notes

1916 births
1944 deaths
Communist members of the French Resistance
Executed Spanish people
FTP-MOI
Resistance members killed by Nazi Germany
International Brigades personnel
People executed by Nazi Germany by firearm
People from the Province of Salamanca
Spanish people executed by Nazi Germany
Affiche Rouge
Exiles of the Spanish Civil War in France
Spanish military personnel of the Spanish Civil War (Republican faction)
Executed assassins
Executed communists